Louis-Sébastien Mercier (6 June 1740 – 25 April 1814) was a French dramatist and writer, whose 1771 novel L'An 2440 is an example of proto-science fiction.

Early life and education
He was born in Paris to a humble family: his father was a skilled artisan who polished swords and metal arms.  Mercier nevertheless received a decent education.

Literary career
Mercier began his literary career by writing heroic epistles.  He early came to the conclusion that Boileau and Racine had ruined the French language and that the true poet wrote in prose.

He wrote plays, pamphlets, and novels and published prodigiously. Mercier often recycled passages from one work to another and expanded on essays he had already written. Mercier's keen observations on his surroundings and the journalistic feel of his writing meant that his work remained riveting despite the nature of its composition. "There is no better writer to consult," Robert Darnton writes, "if one wants to get some idea of how Paris looked, sounded, smelled, and felt on the eve of the Revolution."

The most important of his miscellaneous works are L'An 2440, rêve s'il en fut jamais (1771), L'Essai sur l'art dramatique (1773), Néologie ou Vocabulaire (1801), Le Tableau de Paris (1781–1788), Le nouveau Paris (1799), Histoire de France (1802) and Satire contre Racine et Boileau (1808).

He decried French tragedy as a caricature of antique and foreign customs in bombastic verse and advocated the drame as understood by Diderot. To the philosophers he was entirely hostile. He denied that modern science had made any real advance; he even carried his conservatism so far as to maintain that the earth was a circular flat plane around which revolved the sun.

Mercier wrote some sixty dramas, among which may be mentioned Jean Hennuyer (1772), La Destruction de la ligue (1782), Jennval (1769), Le Juge (1774), Natalie (1775) and La Brouette du vinaigrier (1775).

L'An 2440 (The Year 2440)

Mercier's L'An 2440, rêve s'il en fut jamais (literally, "The Year 2440: A Dream If Ever There Was One"; translated into English as Memoirs of the Year Two Thousand Five Hundred [sic]; and into German as Das Jahr zwey tausend vier hundert und vierzig: Ein Traum aller Träume) is a utopian novel set in the year 2440. An extremely popular work (it went through twenty-five editions after its first appearance in 1770), the work describes the adventures of an unnamed man, who, after engaging in a heated discussion with a philosopher friend about the injustices of Paris, falls asleep and finds himself in a Paris of the future.  Darnton writes that "despite its self-proclaimed character of fantasy...L'An 2440 demanded to be read as a serious guidebook to the future. It offered an astonishing new perspective: the future as a fait accompli and the present as a distant past. Who could resist the temptation to participate in such a thought experiment?  And once engaged in it, who could fail to see that it exposed the rottenness of the society before his eyes, the Paris of the eighteenth century?"

Political views
In politics he was a moderate, and, as a member of the National Convention, he voted against the death penalty for Louis XVI. During the Reign of Terror, he was imprisoned, but he was released after the fall of Robespierre, whom he termed a "Sanguinocrat" (roughly, ruler by bloodshed).

Works 

1760: Hécube à Pyrrhus, héroïde, s.l. 
1762: Hypermnestre à Lyncée, héroïde, s.l. 
1762: Canacée à Macarée et Hypermnestre à Lyncée, héroïdes nouvelles par l’auteur d’Hécube, s.l. 
1762: Philoctète à Péan, son père, héroïde, s.l. 
1763: Crizéas et Zelmine, poème, s.l. 
1763: Épître d’Héloïse à Abailard, imitation nouvelle de Pope, London
1763: Médée à Jason, après le meurtre de ses enfants, héroïde, suivi d’un morceau tiré de Dante, s.l. 
1763: Sénèque mourant à Néron, héroïde, s.l.
1763: Le Bonheur des gens de lettres, discours, Bordeaux 
1764: Discours sur la lecture, Paris 
1764: Saint-Preux à Wolmar après la mort de Julie, ou dernière lettre du roman de la Nouvelle Héloïse, Paris 
1764: La Boucle de cheveux enlevée, poème héroï-comique de Pope, trad., Amsterdam 
1764: Héroïdes et autres pièces de poésie, Paris
1765: Calas sur l’échafaud à ses juges, poème, s.l.
1765: Éloge de René Descartes, Genève et Paris, Chez la Vve Pierres 
1766: Le Génie, poème, London and Paris
1766: Discours sur les malheurs de la guerre et les avantages de la paix, The Hague 
1766: Histoire d’Izerben, poète arabe, trad. de l’arabe, Amsterdam and Paris, Cellot
1767: Éloge de Charles V, roi de France surnommé Le sage, Amsterdam 
1767: Les Amours de Chérale, poème en six chants, suivi du bon génie, Amsterdam 
1767: Lettre de Dulis à son ami, London and Paris, Vve Duchesne 
1767: L’Homme sauvage, histoire trad. de Pfeil, Amsterdam 
1767: La Sympathie, histoire morale, Amsterdam 
1767: Virginie, tragédie en cinq actes, Paris, Vve Duchesne 
1768: Que notre Âme peut se suffire à elle-même, épître philosophique qui a concouru pour le prix de l’Académie française, in 1768, London
1768: Contes moraux, ou les Hommes comme il y en a peu, Paris, Panckoucke
1768: Songes philosophiques, London and Paris, Lejay
1768: Zambeddin, histoire orientale, Amsterdam and Paris, Delalain 
1768: Fragments d’un éloge de Henri IV, roi de France, Paris 
1769: Les Cerises, conte en vers, Paris, Lejay
1769: Jenneval ou le Barnevelt français, five-act drama in prose, Paris 
1770: Le Déserteur, drame en cinq actes et en prose, Paris, Lejay 
1770: Songes d’un ermite, à l’Hermitage de Saint-Amour, Paris, Hardy 
1770: Olinde et Sophronie, drame héroïque en cinq actes et en prose, Paris, Lejay 
1771: L'An 2440, rêve s'il en fut jamais, Amsterdam, Van-Harrevelt
1772: Le Faux Ami, drame en trois actes en prose, Paris, Lejay 
1772: L’Indigent, drame en quatre actes en prose, Paris, Lejay 
1772: Jean Hennuyer, évêque de Lisieux, three-act drama, London
1773: Du théâtre ou Nouvel essai sur l’art dramatique, Amsterdam, E. van Harrevelt 
1774: Childéric, premier roi de France, drame héroïque en trois actes, en prose, London and Paris, Ruault 
1774: Le Juge, drame en trois actes, in prose, London and Paris, Ruault 
1775: La Brouette du vinaigrier, three-act drama, London and Paris 
1775: Nathalie, drame en quatre actes, London and Paris, Ruault 
1775: Premier mémoire par le Sieur Mercier contre la troupe des Comédiens français, Paris, Vve Herissant 
1775: Mémoire à consulter et consultation par le Sieur Mercier contre la troupe des comédiens ordinaires du Roi, Paris, Clousier 
1776: Molière, five-act drama in prose, imitated from de Goldoni, Amsterdam and Paris
1776: Éloges et discours académiques qui ont concouru pour les prix de l’Académie française et de plusieurs autres académies, par l’auteur de l’ouvrage intitulé l’an deux mille quatre cent quarante, Amsterdam 
1776: Jezzenemours, roman dramatique, Amsterdam 
1776: Les Hommes comme il y en a peu et les Génies comme il n’y en a point, contes moraux orientaux, persans, arabes, turcs, anglais, français, etc., les uns pour rire, les autres à dormir debout, Nouv. éd. Bouillon, impr. de la Soc. Typographique, Neuchâtel
1776: Éloges et discours philosophiques, Paris
1777: Les Comédiens, ou le Foyer, comédie en un acte et en prose, Paris, Successeurs de la Vve Duchesne
1778: De la Littérature et des littérateurs suivi d’un Nouvel examen de la tragédie française, Yverdon
1778: Théâtre complet, Amsterdam 
1778: La Vertu chancelante, ou la Vie de Mlle d’Amincourt, Liège and Paris 
1779: Le Campagnard, ou le Riche désabusé, drame en deux actes et en prose, The Hague 
1780: Le Charlatan, ou le docteur Sacroton, comédie-parade en un acte, en prose, The Hague and Paris, Vve Ballard et fils
1780: La Demande imprévue, three-act comedy, Paris, Vve Ballard et Vve Duchesne
1781: Tableau de Paris, Hambourg et Neuchâtel, S. Fauche 
1781: L’Homme de ma connaissance, two-act comedy in prose, Amsterdam and Paris, Vve Ballard et fils
1781: Le Gentillâtre, three-act comedy in prose, Amsterdam and Paris
1781: Le Philosophe du Port-au-Bled, s.l.
1782: Zoé, drame en trois actes, Neuchâtel, Impr. de la Société typographique
1782: Les Tombeaux de Vérone, drame en cinq actes, Neuchâtel, Impr. de la Société typographique 
1782: La Destruction de la Ligue, ou la réduction de Paris, pièce nationale en quatre actes, Amsterdam and Paris)
1782: L’Habitant de la Guadeloupe, four-act comedy, Neuchâtel, Impr. de la Société typographique 
1783: Portraits des rois de France, Neuchâtel, Impr. de la Société typographique 
1783: La Mort de Louis XI, roi de France, pièce historique, Neuchâtel
1784: Montesquieu à Marseille, Lausanne, J.-P. Heubach et Paris, Poinçot
1784: Mon Bonnet de nuit, Neuchâtel, Impr. de la Société typographique
1784: Charles II, roi d’Angleterre, en certain lieu, comédie très morale en cinq actes très courts, par un disciple de Pythagore, Venise [i.e. Paris] 
1784: Les Hospices, s.l.
1785: L’Observateur de Paris et du royaume, ou Mémoires historiques et politiques, London
1785: Portrait de Philippe II, roi d’Espagne, Amsterdam 
1785: Histoire d’une jeune Luthérienne, Neuchâtel, Impr. Jérémie Vitel 
1786: L'An 2440, rêve s'il en fut jamais, 2e éd. suivi de l’Homme de fer, songe, Amsterdam 
1786: Les Entretiens du Palais-Royal de Paris, Paris, Buisson 
1787: Notions claires sur les gouvernements, Amsterdam
1788: Songes et visions philosophiques, Amsterdam and Paris
1788: Tableau de Paris, nouv. éd. corrigée et augmentée, Amsterdam 
1788: Les Entretiens du jardin des Tuileries de Paris, Paris, Buisson
1788: La Maison de Molière, five-act comedy in prose, Paris, Guillot 
1789: Lettre au Roi, contenant unprojet pour liquider en peu d’années toutes les dettes de l’État soulageant le peuple du fardeau des impositions, Amsterdam et Paris, chez les Marchands de nouveautés 
1789: Adieux à l’année, s.l.n.d. 
1790: Le Nouveau Doyen de Killerine, three-act comedy in prose, Paris 
1790: Réflexions très importantes sur les nouvelles élections des municipalités, s.l.
1791: De Jean-Jacques Rousseau considéré comme l’un des premiers auteurs de la Révolution, Paris, Buisson
1791: Adresse de l’agriculture à MM. de l’Assemblée nationale régénératrice de l’Empire français, Paris, C.-F. Perlet
1792: Fragments de politique et d’histoire, Paris, Buisson
1792: Fictions morales, Paris, Impr. du Cercle social 
1792: Le Vieillard et ses trois filles, three-act play in prose, Paris, Cercle social 
1792: Le Ci-Devant noble, three-act comedy, Paris, Impr. du Cercle social 
1792: Réflexions d’un patriote : Ier sur les assignats; IIe sur les craintes d’une banqueroute nationale; IIIe sur les causes de la baisse des changes étrangers; IVe sur l’organisation de la garde nationale; Ve sur les finances et impositions; VIe sur les assemblées primaires; VIIe sur les droits de patentes avec une Adresse aux Français, Paris, Impr. H.-J. Janse
1792: Les Crimes de Philippe II, roi d’Espagne, drame historique, s.l. 
1793: Isotisme ou le Bon Génie, poème en prose suivi de la Sympathie, histoire morale, Paris 
1793: Opinion de Louis Sébastien Mercier sur Louis Capet, Paris, Impr. de Restif 
1793: Philédon et Prothumie, poème érotique suivi de fragments des Amours de Chérale, Paris 
1794: Timon d’Athènes en cinq actes, en prose, imitation de Shakespeare, Paris, Impr. T. Gérard 
1794: Fénelon dans son diocèse, pièce dramatique en trois actes et en prose, Paris, marchands de nouveautés 
1796: Discours de L.-S. Mercier prononcé le 18 floréal sur René Descartes, Paris, Impr. Nationale 
1796: Rapport fait au nom d’une commission spéciale sur l’enseignement des langues vivantes, Paris, Impr. Nationale 
1796: Second Rapport fait au nom d’une commission spéciale sur l’enseignement des langues vivantes, Paris, Impr. Nationale
1796: Rapport et projet de résolution au nom d’une commission, sur la pétition des peintres, sculpteurs, graveurs, architectes, relativement au droit de patente, Paris, Impr. Nationale
1796: Motion d’ordre et discours sur le rétablissement d’une loterie nationale, Paris, Impr. Nationale
1796: Opinion de L.-S. Mercier sur les sépultures privées, Paris, Impr. Bertrand-Quinquet 
1797: Hortense et d’Artamon, two-act comedy in prose, Paris, Cercle social 
1797: Le Libérateur, two-act comedy, Paris, Cercle social
1797: Opinion de L.-S. Mercier sur le message du Directoire, converti en motion, tendant à astreindre les électeurs au serment décrété pour les fonctionnaires publics, Paris, Impr. Bertrand-Quinquet 
1798: Le Nouveau Paris, Paris, Fuchs 
1798: Mon dictionnaire, s.l.n.d. 
1799: L’An deux mille quatre cent quarante, rêve s’il en fût jamais, suivi de L’homme de fer, songe, Paris, Bresson et Casteret, Dugour et Durand
1801: Néologie ou Vocabulaire de mots nouveaux, à renouveler ou pris dans des acceptions nouvelles, Paris, Moussard. Nouvelle édition établie, présented and annotated by Jean-Claude Bonnet, Belin, 2009.
1802: Histoire de France, depuis Clovis jusqu’au règne de Louis XVI, Paris, chez Cérioux et Lepetit jeune
1803: Satyres contre les astronomes, Paris, Terrelonge
1804: Charité, Versailles, Ph.-D. Pierres, Paris, Bossange, Masson & Besson 
1806: De l’impossibilité du système astronomique de Copernic et de Newton, Paris, Dentu 
1806 L’Apollon pythique, ou des Arts matériellement imitatifs, Paris 
1808: Satyres contre Racine et Boileau, Paris, Hénée 
1809: La Maison de Socrate le sage, five-act comedy, prose, Paris, Duminil-Lesueur Read on line

See also
History of science fiction
Timeline of science fiction
Society of the Friends of Truth

Notes 
  Robert Darnton,  The Forbidden Best-Sellers of Pre-Revolutionary France (New York: W.W. Norton, 1996), 118.
  Darnton,  Forbidden Best-Sellers, 120.

Sources 
 Bibliotheca Augustana
 Léon Béclard, Sébastien Mercier, sa vie, son œuvre, son temps d'après des documents inédits, Paris: Honoré Champion, 1903, réimp. Hildesheim; New York: G. Olms, 1982.
 Jean-Claude Bonnet, Le Paris de Louis Sébastien Mercier : cartes et index topographique, Paris, Mercure de France, 1994.
 Jean-Claude Bonnet, Louis Sébastien Mercier (1740–1814) : un hérétique en littérature, Paris, Mercure de France, 1995.
 Élisabeth Bourguinat, Les Rues de Paris au XVIIIe siècle : le regard de Louis Sébastien Mercier, Paris, Paris Musées, 1999.
 Paulette L. Castillo, Les Deux Paris de Louis-Sébastien Mercier, Thèse d’honneur de 1977 de Smith College, Northampton.
 Anne-Marie Deval, Sébastien Mercier, précurseur, Thèse de l’Université de Californie à Los Angeles, 1968.
 R. Doumic in the Revue des deux mondes (15 July 1903)
 Louis de Bordes de Fortage, Sébastien Mercier à Bordeaux, Bordeaux, Gounouilhou, 1918.
 Gilles Girard, Inventaire des manuscrits de Louis-Sébastien Mercier conservés à la Bibliothèque de l’Arsenal, Reims, Département de français de l’université, 1974.
 Hermann Hofer, Louis-Sébastien Mercier précurseur et sa fortune : avec des documents inédits : recueil d’études sur l’influence de Mercier, Munich, Fink, 1977.
 Anne Le Fur, Le Paris de Louis Sébastien Mercier : cartes et index toponymique, Paris, Mercure de France, 1994.
 Mario Mormile, La Néologie révolutionnaire de Louis-Sébastien Mercier, Rome, Bulzoni, 1973.
 René Pomeau, L’Imaginaire d’anticipation de Louis-Sébastien Mercier à George Orwell, Paris, Palais de l’Institut, 1998.
 Enrico Rufi, Louis-Sébastien Mercier, Paris, CNRS éditions, 1996.
 Laurent Turcot,   Le promeneur à Paris au XVIIIe siècle. Paris, Gallimard, 2007.
 Nedd Willard, La Moralité du théâtre de Louis-Sébastien Mercier, Paris, [s.n.], 1955.
 Nedd Willard, Le Génie et la folie au dix-huitième siècle, Paris, Presses Universitaires de France, 1963.

External links

 Louis Sébastien Mercier on data.bnf.fr
 
 

1740 births
1814 deaths
Writers from Paris
French republicans
Deputies to the French National Convention
Members of the Council of Five Hundred
18th-century French dramatists and playwrights
19th-century French dramatists and playwrights
French science fiction writers
Fiction set in 2040
Burials at Père Lachaise Cemetery
18th-century French novelists
19th-century French journalists
French male journalists
18th-century essayists
19th-century French essayists
19th-century French male writers
18th-century French male writers